The Cisrhenian Republic was a planned client state during the French Revolutionary Wars in 1797 on the Left Bank of the Rhine under occupation by France, where the Coup of 18 Fructidor caused a decision to annex the area instead.

History

At the beginning of the War of the First Coalition, in 1792, French revolutionary troops conquered the Palatinate region and occupied the cities of Mainz, Speyer, and Worms. They terminated the centuries-long reign of the local nobility and clergy, which met with approval among broad sections of the public. A German Jacobin Club was established at Mainz in October to promote the export of revolution in the lands of the Holy Roman Empire together with the occupying forces. The short-lived Republic of Mainz, established in March 1793, was the first attempt to implement a democratic state on current German territory. The Republic ended after Prussian and Austrian coalition troops started the Siege of Mainz and forced the surrender of the city.

Under the terms of the 1795 Peace of Basel, the Kingdom of Prussia had been compelled to cede all her territories west of the Rhine river, but the French forces initially failed to coordinate a civil administration or to establish a Rhenish buffer state, and the ongoing occupation at the expense of the civilian population met with growing rejection. The situation did not improve until, in early 1797, the French Directory delegated General Louis Lazare Hoche to build up an orderly public administration based on the French model.

Together the Rhenish lands from Cleves up to Bingen were planned to be combined into a republic under the rule of General Hoche as 'Protector'. The republican movement was again gaining a substantial following, at least in Rhenish cities such as Bonn or Koblenz.

In view of Napoleon's Italian campaign and the creation of the Cisalpine Republic in June 1797, German democrats like Joseph Görres urged the proclamation of a Cisrhenian Republic, after the first hoisting of a green, white and red tricolour flag in Cologne on 28 August. Similar ceremonies were also held in Rheinbach, Koblenz and Bonn, accompanied by the planting of "liberty trees" throughout the country. The democrats occupied the most important municipal palaces in the area. The number of supporters of the Republic among the population is difficult to assess from today's perspective. In any case, the strong presence of occupying troops, entailing taxes and contributions, persisted.

Meanwhile, the Coup of 18 Fructidor (4 September 1797) in Paris boosted radical forces demanding an annexation of the Left Bank by the French motherland. When General Hoche died unexpectedly on September 18 at the age of 29, the idea of a Cisrhenian Republic lost her strongest advocate. By the Treaty of Campo Formio on 18 October 1797, Emperor Francis II accepted the Rhine border and the administration of the region was officially assigned to France. On December 17, French Commissioner François Joseph Rudler had the green, white and red Cisrhenian flag taken down from the Liberty Tree in Bonn and replaced by the blue, white and red tricolor. "It also became visible from the outside that the illusion of self-determination of the political future of the left bank of the Rhine was finally at an end." Rudler also had the French  implemented, what ended any idea of a planned autonomous Republic.

The French annexation was internationally announced in the 1801 Treaty of Lunéville, and the Rhineland was officially incorporated on 9 March 1801.

Further reading
 Yvonne Kafka: Das Wendejahr 1797/8: Cisrhenanische Republik oder Annektion? [sic] Grin-Verlag für akademische Texte, München 2011, .

1797 in France
1797 in the Holy Roman Empire
1797 in Europe
Former states and territories of North Rhine-Westphalia
Former states and territories of Rhineland-Palatinate
History of the Rhineland